Cacostola janzeni is a species of beetle in the family Cerambycidae. It was described by Chemsak and Linsley in 1986. It is known from Honduras and Mexico.

References

Cacostola
Beetles described in 1986